Cabinet Söder is the name of any of two cabinets in the German state of Bavaria led by Markus Söder:
Cabinet Söder I (2018)
Cabinet Söder II (2018–present)